Víctor Estrella Burgos was the defending champion, but withdrew from the tournament .

Gerald Melzer won the title, defeating Alejandro González in the final 7–6(7–4) , 6–3 .

Seeds

Draw

Finals

Top half

Bottom half

References
 Main Draw
 Qualifying Draw

Morelos Open - Singles